The Vehbi Koç Foundation is one of the biggest non-governmental charitable organizations in Turkey. It was established on January 17, 1969 by the Turkish entrepreneur and philanthropist Vehbi Koç (1901-1996). The foundation is active in the fields of education, healthcare and culture.

The board of directors is currently chaired by Semahat Arsel, the eldest daughter of Vehbi Koç. Executive committee's president is Suna Koç, another daughter. Erdal Yıldırım is the managing director of the foundation. The headquarters of the foundation is located at Nakkaştepe in Kuzguncuk, Istanbul.

Education

The Vehbi Koç Foundation established Koç University, Koç School and many Koç elementary schools across the country, and a number of hospitals as well.

Culture

The Vehbi Koç Foundation already runs various museums across Istanbul, including Arter, a contemporary art exhibition space, which opened in 2010. This four-storey space housed in an historic building on İstiklal Avenue is owned by Ömer Koç, the vice chairman of Koç Holding. The Sadberk Hanım Museum, based at the Azaryan Mansion in Istanbul’s northern Sariyer district, houses the private collection of Sadberk Koç, the wife of Vehbi Koç. The most recent major cultural project of the Vehbi Koç Foundation is the establishment of a contemporary art museum scheduled to be opened at the end of 2017 in Istanbul’s Dolapdere district, close to the city center.

See also 
 American Hospital, Istanbul
 Koç University
 Vehbi Koç
 Koç School

References

Koç family
Foundations based in Turkey
1969 establishments in Turkey
Organizations based in Istanbul